Vafaatheri Kehiveriya is a 2016 Maldivian romantic film directed by Ali Seezan. Produced by Mohamed Abdullah under Dhedhekeves Production, the film stars Ali Seezan, Maleeha Waheed,  Zeenath Abbas and Ahmed Saeed in pivotal roles. The film was released on 10 May 2016. The film was based on Ibrahim Waheedh's novel Vanhanaa. Apart from four scenes, the whole film was shot in Ha. Kelaa.

Cast 
 Ali Seezan as Fayaa
 Maleeha Waheed as Nuzoo
 Zeenath Abbas as Ainthu
 Ahmed Saeed as Iburey
 Ahmed Azmeel as Lahche

Soundtrack

Response 
The film received a mixed to negative reception from critics. Ahmed Nadheem from Avas blamed the title of the film for giving the impression of an "old typical" taste to the film. He further criticised the acting of lead actress Maleeha Waheedh; for her weak portrayal of the character and bad dialogue delivery. Besides, he also criticised the acting of Zeenath Abbas and Ahmed Azmeel. However, he liked the main storyline and the plot twists of the film. Aishath Maahaa from the same publication echoed similar sentiments for the film. She was pleased with the overall make up and styling carried out in the film, however was disappointed that it did not show the "island life".

The film was premiered at Olympus on 10 May 2016. After a few shows, the production team had to cease the screening of the film due to the difficulty in getting further dates in Olympus and also due to bad weather conditions. The film was later scheduled to be released at Schwack Cinema, however was cancelled due to less tickets than minimum being sold.

Accolades

References

2016 films
2016 romantic drama films
Maldivian romantic drama films
Films directed by Ali Seezan